Myslava is a borough (city ward) of the city of Košice, Slovakia. It retains much of its rural character.

History 

The first written record of Myslava dates back to 1382.

It was an independent village municipality until it was connected to Košice.

Statistics
 Area: 
 Population: 2,257 (December 2017)
 Density of population: 320/km2 (December 2017)
 District: Košice II
 Mayor: Iveta Šimková (as of 2018 elections)

Gallery

References

External links

 Official website of the Myslava borough
 Article on the Myslava borough at Cassovia.sk
 Official website of the town of Košice

Boroughs of Košice
Villages in Slovakia merged with towns